Heathpool is a residential suburb of Adelaide, Australia, east of the city, in the City of Norwood Payneham St Peters.

History
It was one of three large properties in the Marryatville area, and named by early settler George Reed, after his home in Hethpool, Northumberland.

The house at 11 Northumberland Avenue was owned by Henry Woodhouse Crompton for many years.

References

Further reading
Much of the early history of Kensington, Marryatville and Heathpool are described in this article, which has been split by the scanning process on Trove (and is followed by other articles related to the area):
 (Part one of single article)
 (Part two of Kensington and Marryatville article) 

Suburbs of Adelaide